James Schofield (1854 – date of death unknown) was an English cricketer. Schofield's batting style is unknown, but it is known he played as a wicket-keeper. He was born at Rochdale, Lancashire.

Schofield made his first-class debut for Lancashire against Derbyshire at Old Trafford in 1876. He made three further first-class appearances for Lancashire in 1876, against Kent, Derbyshire and Sussex. In his four first-class appearances, he scored 27 runs at an average of 6.75, with a high score of 11. Behind the stumps he took seven catches and made a single stumping.

References

External links
James Schofield at ESPNcricinfo
James Schofield at CricketArchive

1854 births
Year of death unknown
Cricketers from Rochdale
English cricketers
Lancashire cricketers
Wicket-keepers